Saint-Félix-de-Dalquier is a municipality in the Canadian province of Quebec, located in the Abitibi Regional County Municipality.

Demographics
Population trend:
 Population in 2021: 1,026 (2016 to 2021 population change: 9.1%)
 Population in 2016: 940
 Population in 2011: 856 
 Population in 2006: 936
 Population in 2001: 938 (or 933 when adjusted to 2006 boundaries)
 Population in 1996: 978
 Population in 1991: 959

Private dwellings occupied by usual residents: 405 (total dwellings: 414)

Mother tongue:
 English as first language: 2.7%
 French as first language: 97.3%
 English and French as first language: 0%
 Other as first language: 0%

Municipal council
 Mayor: Raymond Carignan
 Councillors: Jacques Larochelle, Fernand Dion, Mario Inkel, Marcel Bourque, André Lévesque, Robert Blais

References

Municipalities in Quebec
Incorporated places in Abitibi-Témiscamingue